Coorabin is a locality in the Riverina district of New South Wales, Australia. It was the site of a now-closed railway station between 1912 and 1975 on the Oaklands railway line.

Coorabin railway station

References

Towns in the Riverina
Towns in New South Wales